"You Are" is a song recorded, co-written, and co-produced by Canadian-American country artist Aaron Goodvin. The track was co-written with Brandon Hood, and co-produced by Matt McClure. It became Goodvin's first #1 Canada Country hit.

Commercial performance
"You Are" was certified Gold by Music Canada on December 11, 2019, with over 40,000 sales. It reached a peak of #1 on the Billboard Canada Country chart dated February 16, 2019, marking Goodvin's first chart-topper. It also reached a peak of #96 on the Canadian Hot 100, Goodvin's second highest entry there.

Music video
The official music video for "You Are" premiered on October 4, 2018, and was directed by Joel Stewart.

Charts

Certifications

References

2018 songs
2018 singles
Aaron Goodvin songs
Warner Music Group singles
Songs written by Aaron Goodvin